Elizabeth Fowler may refer to:

Eliza Haywood (c. 1693–1756), born Elizabeth Fowler, English writer, actress and publisher
Lilian Fowler (Elizabeth Lilian Maud Fowler), Australian politician
Beth Fowler (born 1940), American actress and singer